Ilyes Gharbi (Arabic: إلياس الغربي) is a Tunisian  broadcaster working for the Carthage Channel. Before that, he worked in the Radio in Mosaique FM, Xpress FM, and in several other channels such as Al-Hiwar Al-Tunisi, Al-Watania 1 and Nessma.

Career 
He worked for several years at the Tunisian Radio Mosaique, where he presented the program “Fm by Night”. Then he moved to Nessma TV to be the first presenter of "Nass Nessma" program. Later, he resigned from the channel. He returned to Nessma TV to become a broadcaster after the Tunisian revolution. On March 17, 2011, Ilyes Gharbi and the Tunisian journalist Reem Saidi hosted the US Secretary of State Hillary Clinton on Nessma TV. Later, he resigned from Nessma TV in April 2011 and joined the Tunisian Radio Xpress FM. He worked as a lead presenter for “Hadith Al Sa’a” program on the Tunisian National Channel 1. Since September 2012, he has been presenting news on Nessma TV.

He was appointed to be the Director General of Tunisian Television on September 22, 2016 by Tunisian Prime Minister Youssef Chahed. Then he was removed from his position in June 2017. He resigned from Al-Hiwar Al-Tounsi in 2018 and he joined Carthage + in August 2018.

Personal life 
He was married to the Tunisian actress Sawsan Maalej but then they divorced.

References 

Tunisian radio presenters
Living people
Year of birth missing (living people)
Tunisian television personalities